Nepytia semiclusaria, the southern nepytia, is a moth of the  family Geometridae.

The wingspan is about 36 mm. Adults are on the wing year round.

The larvae feed on Pinus species.

External links
Bug Guide
Images

Ourapterygini
Moths described in 1863